Neinstedt is a village and a former municipality in the district of Harz, Saxony-Anhalt, in the Harz area. Since 1 January 2009, it is part of the town Thale. It has a station on the Magdeburg–Thale railway.

Former municipalities in Saxony-Anhalt
Thale